Governor of Papua is the regional head who holds the provincial government in Papua together with the Deputy Governor of Papua. The Governor and Deputy Governor of Papua are elected through general elections which are held every 5 years. The current governor of Papua is Ridwan Rumasukun.

The following is a list of the governors of Papua, including when they were still called West Irian and Irian Jaya

References

Notes 

Papua (province)